Allerton Hall is in Clarke's Gardens, Allerton, Lancashire, England. It is recorded in the National Heritage List for England as a designated Grade II* listed building. Built in 1736 for the Hardman family, the house has a long history dating to the Medieval period. Allerton Hall was rented by Charles Prioleau, a Confederate cotton merchant during the American Civil War. Presently, the building operates as a Public House.

History
During the medieval period the manor of Allerton was held by the Lathom family.

During her long widowhood, Elizabeth Lathom, the wife of Richard Lathom (1563–1602), occupied Allerton Hall. She gave her son, Edward Lathom, the occupation and profit of "this my hall in Allerton". Her other son, Richard Lathom, a Royalist, fought alongside his uncles in the English Civil War. Richard survived the war but his Estate was "forfeited in the name of treason" by Cromwell's parliament in 1652 and the commissioners of parliament subsequently confiscated the estate.

When assessments were made for the hearth tax in 1666, Allerton Hall was one of the larger houses in the parish of Childwall with eight hearths; this was exceeded only by Speke Hall with twenty-one hearths and Brettargh Holt with nine.

The estate was bought in 1736 by Sir John Hardman Esq. and his brother James, and it is likely that the present house on the site originates from this time. Hardman was a West Indies merchant and slave trader originally from Rochdale. Sold to the Hardmans in 1736 for £7,700 and 
rebuilt in the Palladian style. The Hardmans were involved in 46 slave voyages between 1729 
and 1761 from Africa to the West Indies. When John died the property passed to his brother, James, who himself subsequently died several years later.

The property then passed to James Hardman's widow, Jane Hardman in 1754. In about 1779, the house was bought from the Hardmans by the lawyer, philanthropist and abolitionist, William Roscoe. Roscoe completed the building of the house but had to sell it in 1816 when he became bankrupt. There were a number of Hardman claimants to the ownership of the Hall, however, none succeeded as the family's wealth had deteriorated since selling to Roscoe.

During the American Civil War, the mansion was rented by Charles Kuhn Prioleau, an American landowner and slaver from South Carolina who financially supported the Confederate States, and who married Mary Elizabeth Wright Hardman, known as the "Belle of Liverpool".

In the early part of the 20th century the building was donated it to Liverpool City Council in 1927. The building was damaged by two fires, in 1994 and in 1995.

Architecture
Allerton Hall is designed in Palladian style and built in red sandstone with three storeys. It is a symmetrical building, extending over eleven bays; the central three bays and the lateral two bays on each side project forward. The central three bays form a portico with Ionic columns and a pediment. The ground floor of the building is rusticated.

Surviving the fires, are a room at the west end which has panelled walls and a stucco ceiling in Rococo style, and parts of Roscoe's library. In the grounds to the west of the house is a sundial dated 1750.

Present day
In 2009 Allerton Hall was run as a public house known as the Pub in the Park. As of 2017, it is known as Allerton Hall - Farmhouse Inn.

References

Grade II* listed buildings in Liverpool
Grade II* listed houses
Pubs in Liverpool
American Civil War sites
Country houses in Merseyside
Palladian architecture